Pharmacis bertrandi is a moth of the family Hepialidae. It is known from France and Italy.

References

External links

Lepiforum.de

Moths described in 1936
Hepialidae
Moths of Europe